Kurlovo is a rural locality (a village) in Demidovskoye Rural Settlement, Gus-Khrustalny District, Vladimir Oblast, Russia. The population was 2 as of 2010.

Geography 
The village is located 15 km east from Demidovo, 39 km south from Gus-Khrustalny.

References 

Rural localities in Gus-Khrustalny District